Phat kaphrao, also spelled pad krapow, kaprao, is one of the most popular Thai à la carte dishes.

History 

By some accounts, phat kaphrao was included  as part of Prime Minister Field Marshal Plaek Phibunsongkhram's Thai cultural mandates during WWII. Phat kaphrao, as well as pad thai, were one of the promoted dishes in local Thai food contests. 

Phat kaphrao was inspired by stir frying, a staple cooking process of Chinese cuisine.

Some of the first four survivors of the Tham Luang cave rescue asked for phat kaphrao as their first proper meal after two weeks of being trapped inside the cave.

Ingredients 
Phat kaphrao consists of meat such as pork, chicken, beef, and seafood stir fried with Thai holy basil and garlic. It is served with rice and topped up (optional) with fried eggs or khai dao. The main seasonings are soy sauce, Thai fish sauce, oyster sauce (optional), cane sugar, and bird's eye chili. 

Over time, phat kaphrao has evolved with the addition of other ingredients such as Chinese century eggs and Thai local vegetables, namely asparagus beans, baby corns, onions, carrots, cowpeas, banana peppers, mushrooms, Chinese kales, bamboo shoots and coconut shoots. However, adding vegetables in phat kaphrao is also seen as an effort to reduce the cost of meat and increase profit margins on the part of food vendors.

Common variants: 
 Phat kaphrao kai – stir-fried holy basil with chicken
 Phat kaphrao mu – stir-fried holy basil with pork
 Phat kaphrao mu sap – stir-fried holy basil with minced pork
 Phat kaphrao tap mu – stir-fried holy basil with pork livers
 Phat kaphrao mu krop – stir-fried holy basil with crispy pork belly
 Phat kaphrao nuea – stir-fried holy basil with beef
 Phat kaphrao nuea sap – stir-fried holy basil with minced beef
 Phat kaphrao lukchin – stir-fried holy basil with meatballs
 Phat kaphrao kung – stir-fried holy basil with prawns
 Phat kaphrao pla muek – stir-fried holy basil with squid
 Phat kaphrao ruam mit – stir-fried holy basil with meat and seafood
 Phat kaphrao ruam mit thale – stir-fried holy basil with seafood
 Phat kaphrao khai yiao ma – stir-fried holy basil with Chinese century eggs
 Phat kaphrao het – stir-fried holy basil with mushrooms

References

Thai cuisine